KDSS may refer to:

KDSS, a radio station (92.7 FM) licensed to Ely, Nevada, United States
Kincardine & District Secondary School in Ontario, Canada
Kinetic Dynamic Suspension System